Reinier Leers (1654 – 1714) was a publisher in Rotterdam, whose works included the journal Histoire des Ouvrages des Savans.

References

Dutch publishers (people)
1654 births
1714 deaths